Braxston Cave (born July 29, 1989) is a former American football center. He went undrafted in the 2013 NFL draft. He played college football at Notre Dame.

High school career
Cave played for Penn High School in Mishawaka, Indiana. Cave was one of 12 finalists for Indiana's "Mr. Football" award, he was named to the Indiana top-50 all-state team by the Indiana Football Coaches Association, he was runner-up for the Offensive Lineman of the Year Award sponsored by the Indianapolis Star, and he made the Scout.com All-America second-team. Cave was selected to play in the first Under Armour All-America Game in Orlando, Florida.

College career
Cave played college football for the Notre Dame Fighting Irish in nearby South Bend, Indiana. He was a starter beginning in 2010, his junior year. He was injured in 2011, missing the rest of the year, and played as a fifth-year senior in 2012. He was named a third-team Associated Press All-American.

NFL career
Cave went undrafted in the 2013 NFL Draft. He was signed by the Cleveland Browns for the preseason but did not make the team. In 2014, he was a preseason signing of the New England Patriots, but again was cut.

In September 2015, Cave was cut by the Detroit Lions during the final round of roster cuts, but was later signed to the team's practice squad. He was signed to the active roster off the practice squad on December 30, 2015 before the Lions' final game of the 2015 season.

References

1989 births
Living people
People from Granger, Indiana
Players of American football from Indiana
American football centers
Notre Dame Fighting Irish football players
Under Armour All-American football players
Detroit Lions players
Cleveland Browns players